St. Peter Cathedral is a large Roman Catholic cathedral located on Baraga Avenue in Marquette, Michigan. As the mother church of the Diocese of Marquette, it is one of the most notable marks of Catholic presence in the Upper Peninsula. The cathedral was listed on the National Register of Historic Places in 2012.

History
The current church is nothing like it first was, when a Jesuit priest named Father Jean-Baptiste Menet began holding services on the site in a small log cabin. Upon Bishop Frederic Baraga’s visit to the site, it was determined that a larger, more prominent church should be built, and that eventually the see should be moved to Marquette from Sault Ste. Marie. Construction began in 1864, with Baraga himself laying the cornerstone. Two years later he dedicated the building, but he did not live to see his beloved cathedral catch fire.

Some have suggested that this first fire, on October 2, 1879, was caused by Irish arsonists who were enraged that Father John Kenny had been removed as pastor. Though the building was destroyed, the congregation's resolve was fervent as ever, and plans were made to continue meeting in the basement before a new cathedral could be erected. It took nine winters to complete the new building.

The church also faced another tragic fire which destroyed everything except the sandstone walls: a few minutes after four a.m. on November 3, 1935, the building again erupted in flames. The parish celebrated Mass in high school auditorium for several months until the cathedral could be restored.

Extensive work and money was put into its reconstruction and beautification, including elaborate marble work and Romanesque columns, as well as an extended nave and domes on the tops of the steeples. This church is one of around 200, including at least three other cathedrals, that incorporates the work of architectural sculptor Corrado Parducci.

Burials
Frederic Baraga
Ignatius Mrak
John Vertin
Frederick Eis
Francis Joseph Magner
Thomas Lawrence Noa
Mark Francis Schmitt

Images

See also

List of Catholic cathedrals in the United States
List of cathedrals in the United States

References

External links

Official Cathedral Site
Diocese of Marquette Official Site 

 
Churches in the Roman Catholic Diocese of Marquette
Peter Cathedral, Marquette
Buildings with sculpture by Corrado Parducci
Buildings and structures in Marquette, Michigan
Tourist attractions in Marquette County, Michigan
Roman Catholic churches completed in 1890
Roman Catholic churches completed in 1938
Churches on the National Register of Historic Places in Michigan
National Register of Historic Places in Marquette County, Michigan
19th-century Roman Catholic church buildings in the United States